China Film Group Corporation (CFGC), is the largest, most influential film enterprise in the People's Republic of China, owned by the Central Propaganda Department of the Chinese Communist Party. According to Forbes, it is a state monopoly that all imported films have to work with. It also runs theaters and finances, produces, and distributes films. In 2014, the company was the largest film distributor in China, with 32.8% of the market.

History
The predecessor China Film Corporation was established in 1949. For 40 years until the end of 1992, China Film Import & Export Corporation was the only film buyer and distributor in China. From 1 January 1993, 16 other Chinese film studios became responsible for distributing their own films. In 1999, the corporation became known as the China Film Group Corporation. It remained the only importer of foreign films in China and is a major exporter of Chinese films.

Businesses 

China Film Group is involved in a variety of businesses which include film and television production, film distribution and exhibition, film importation and exportation, cinema circuit management, digital cinema construction, print developing and processing, film equipment management, film and TV CD production, ancillary products, advertising, property management as well as real estate. China Film group partnered with Crest Digital in 2007, building a 15,000 square meter state-of-the-art DVD and CD manufacturing facility outside Beijing.

Along with the China Research Institute of Film Science & Technology, the group created DMAX, a large-screen film format developed to break IMAX's large-screen monopoly in China.

Subsidiaries 
For over a decade, China Film Group's subsidiary, China Film Import & Export Corporation, has been the sole government-authorized importer of films. Another CFG subsidiary, China Film Co-production Corporation, is charged by the SARFT to oversee and manage all Sino-foreign co-productions.

China Film Group's film and TV production units include: the former China Film Corporation, Beijing Film Studio, China Youth Film Studio, China Film Co-Production Corporation, China Film Equipment Corporation, Movie Channel Production Center, Beijing Film & Video Laboratory and Huayun Film & TV Compact Disk Co., Ltd. The company has an animation division called China Film Animation.

China Film Co-Production Corporation 
The China Film Co-Production Corporation, abbreviated as CFCC, was founded in August 1979.

China Film Co-Production Corporation is authorized by the State Administration of Radio, Film, and Television (SARFT). As a sole agency, CFCC enjoys all rights and liabilities of an individual legal entity.  It was founded to administer affairs relating to film co-production, and provide coordination and other services, pursuant to the Regulations on Administration of the Film and the Rules on Administration of the Sino-Foreign Film Co-production (Edict 31, Edict 52 and other relevant rules by the SARFT). CFCC has its precise roles and functions as follows:

 Process applications of film co-production between Chinese domestic film studios and foreign film companies or filmmakers; execute agreement with all co-operative parties; supervise, coordinate and manage the performance of the agreements.
 Introduce Chinese domestic studios to foreign parties and provide related co-production services.
 Review proposed scripts of the Sino-foreign co-production projects and provide consulting services for the proposed projects.
 Provide assistance in relation to entry visas for foreign crews participating in the production.
 Provide assistance in relation to customs clearance for filming equipment, film stocks and materials to be used in production.
 Conduct preliminary review of the completed films.
 Process application and provide related hospitality services for foreign crews to conduct shooting of short films in Mainland China.
 Organize forums, seminars and symposiums related to Sino-Foreign film co-production.
 Administer other matters instructed by the SARFT.

Procedures for Sino-foreign Co-production	
Both Chinese and overseas parties should sign a co-production agreement or letter of intent upon mutual consensus (the Chinese parties should be state-run companies or private ones with co-production credentials).

The leading Chinese party should submit the script to the provincial film authority, under which it is registered, for preliminary comments (A leading Chinese party affiliated to the central government or state organs is entitled to submit it directly to CFCC).
The leading Chinese party should submit the script and comments given by the provincial film authority and necessary documents to CFCC.
CFCC submits the script and necessary documents to SARFT after preliminary review.
SARFT approves and issues a Co-production Permit.
CFCC organizes the signing of an agreement among all parties.
The leading Chinese party files with CFCC a list of the film's main cast and talent from abroad.
The leading Chinese party should apply to CFCC for entry visas for the foreign crew, and entrust CFCC to handle the China Customs' clearance of temporary entry/exit of such items as equipment, facilities, film negative and other goods for the production.
The leading Chinese party should file the English title of the film with CFCC.
If conducting post-production and film development outside Mainland China, the leading Chinese party should submit an application to CFCC.
The leading Chinese party should submit the completed film to the provincial film authority for preliminary comments before submitting to CFCC, who will the submit the film with its own comments to SARFT for final censorship.

CFCC has established two offices in charge of general administration and co-production business respectively. The general office takes care of general administration, secretary, finance and human resource matters. The business office takes care of administration, service and coordination of film co-production between Chinese film studios and foreign filmmakers, and hosting foreign crews for making non-feature films in Mainland China.

Films 
Each year, China Film Group produces more than 30 feature-length films, 400 TV plays, and 100 telefilms. Its films include The Warlords, Three Kingdoms: Resurrection of the Dragon, Kung Fu Hustle, Golden Bear winner Tuya's Marriage, and Protégé.

Filmography

See also 
 Cinema of China
 Mosfilm

References

External links 
 Official website

 
Chinese film studios
Film production companies of China
State-owned film companies
Mass media companies established in 1999
Chinese companies established in 1999
Companies based in Beijing
Film distributors of China
Chinese brands
Government-owned companies of China